Darryl Keith Henley (born October 30, 1966) is a former American football cornerback in the National Football League (NFL). He was drafted by the Los Angeles Rams in the 1989 NFL draft out of UCLA. In his career, he played in 76 games and amassed 12 interceptions. Henley is currently serving a 41-year prison sentence for trafficking cocaine and attempting to murder the judge and a witness from his trial by hiring contract killers. Joey Gambino and is due to be released in 2036

References

External links
 Intercepted: The Rise and Fall of NFL Cornerback Darryl Henley
 ESPN.com article on Henley's off the field troubles
 Henley's NFL stats

1966 births
Living people
American drug traffickers
American football cornerbacks
American prisoners and detainees
Los Angeles Rams players
UCLA Bruins football players
All-American college football players
Players of American football from Los Angeles
Prisoners and detainees of the United States federal government
American sportspeople convicted of crimes
American people convicted of attempted murder